Owen Cassidy (c.1862 – January 15, 1911 in Watkins, Schuyler County, New York) was an American lawyer and politician from New York.

Life
In 1890, he married Alice Jones, and they had two children. In 1899, he was a member of the New York State Board of Health.

Cassidy was a member of the New York State Senate (40th D.) from 1905 to 1908, sitting in the 128th, 129th, 130th and 131st New York State Legislatures. In 1908, Cassidy was voted down by the 41st senatorial district convention, and ran as an Independent for re-election, but was defeated. Afterwards he resumed the practice of law in Watkins.

He died on January 15, 1911, at his home in Watkins, after having been ill for years, and "bedridden for the last few months".

Sources
 Official New York from Cleveland to Hughes by Charles Elliott Fitch (Hurd Publishing Co., New York and Buffalo, 1911, Vol. IV; pg. 365f)
 STATE HEALTH BOARD SCANDAL in NYT on December 12, 1899
 CASSIDY AN INDEPENDENT in NYT on October 1, 1908
 CASSIDY WILL AID HUGHES in NYT on July 23, 1909
 EX-SENATOR CASSIDY DIES in NYT on January 16, 1911

1862 births
1911 deaths
Republican Party New York (state) state senators
People from Watkins Glen, New York
19th-century American politicians